Michael Bradley Enzi (February 1, 1944 – July 26, 2021) was an American politician who served in the United States Senate from Wyoming as a member of the Republican Party from 1997 to 2021. Prior to his tenure in the United States Senate he served as mayor of Gillette, Wyoming, in the Wyoming House of Representatives from Campbell County, and the Wyoming Senate from the 24th district. He was the longest-serving senator from Wyoming since Francis E. Warren.

Enzi was born in Bremerton, Washington, raised in Thermopolis, Wyoming, and educated at Sheridan High School, George Washington University, and the University of Denver. He served in the Air National Guard, and held positions in the American Legion Boys State, DeMolay International, and United States Junior Chamber. He entered politics with his election as mayor of Gillette after being convinced by Alan Simpson to run and defeating incumbent Mayor Cliff Davis. He was elected to the state house in the 1986 election and served until his appointment to the state senate in 1991.

Enzi was elected to the United States Senate in the 1996 election after defeating future senator John Barrasso in the Republican primary and Secretary of State Kathy Karpan in the general election. During his tenure in the Senate he served as chair of the Health, Education, Labor and Pensions, and Budget committees. He served in the Senate until Cynthia Lummis succeeded him in the 2020 election after his retirement. He died in 2021 following injuries resulting from a bicycling accident.

Early life and education

Michael Bradley Enzi was born on February 1, 1944, in Bremerton, Washington, to Elmer J. Enzi and Dorothy Bradley. He was raised in Thermopolis, Wyoming, and graduated from Sheridan High School in 1962. He graduated from George Washington University with a degree in accounting in 1966 and from the University of Denver with a Master of Business Administration in retail marketing in 1968. He served in the Wyoming Army National Guard from 1967 to 1973. On June 7, 1969, he married Diana Buckley, with whom he had three children, and moved to Gillette, Wyoming.

Enzi was criticized by multiple people, including Wyoming Veterans of Foreign Wars Commander Bill Saunders, for attempting to equate his service in the Wyoming Army National Guard with that of those who served in the Vietnam War although Enzi stated that his comments were misinterpreted.

Enzi was elected to serve as a city councilor in the American Legion Boys State in 1961. He was selected serve as a junior councilor in the Wyoming DeMolay International organization in 1963. In 1970, Enzi was appointed to serve as vice-chair of the nine-member Public Health Nursing Advisory Committee in Gillette. He was elected to serve as president of the Wyoming United States Junior Chamber in 1973. He served as chair of the First Wyoming Bank-Gillette.

Career

Local politics

Enzi defeated Mayor Cliff Davis in Gillette's 1974 mayoral election after having been convinced to run by Alan Simpson and won reelection without opposition in 1978. He announced on July 7, 1982, that he would not run for reelection.

He filled two vacant city council seats in one month in 1976, following the resignation of Ed Geringer and Jack Babcock with Jack Edmunds replacing Geringer and Robert White replacing Babcock. Gillette's Planning and Zoning Commission was created during Enzi's tenure, and he appointed six of the seven positions on the board upon its creation. A water pipeline was built during Enzi's tenure as mayor and prior to its construction water was rationed in Gillette. During the 1978 United States House of Representatives elections he supported Treasurer Ed Witzenburger for the Republican nomination.

He was appointed to serve on the National League of Cities' community development committee. Enzi served as vice-president and president of the Wyoming Association of Municipalities. Enzi's term as president of the Wyoming Association of Municipalities was meant to end in June 1983, but he left office in January so John Nickle was appointed to serve the remainder of his term.

Wyoming Legislature

Enzi ran for one of three seats in the Wyoming House of Representatives from Campbell County in the 1986 election as a Republican and was elected alongside incumbent Republican representatives Dick Wallis and John Hines. All three representatives won reelection in the 1988 election against Democratic nominee Rebecca Claar. All three representatives were reelected in the 1990 election against Democratic nominees Claar, Dave Stueck, and Chuck Tolar.

Enzi was speculated as a possible candidate to replace John Ostlund in the Wyoming Senate in the 1978 election as Ostlund was running in the gubernatorial election, but he instead announced that he would run for reelection as mayor on July 17. Senator Kelly Mader resigned on December 9, 1991, due to him having moved his family to Denver, Colorado, and starting a business there and Enzi was selected to replace Mader on December 13, while David Shippy was selected to replace Enzi in the state house. He faced no opposition in the Republican primary or general election in 1992.

During his tenure in the state house he served on the Education, Corporations and Elections, and Mines and Minerals committees. He served on the Joint Appropriations committee and served as the chair of the Revenue committee in the state senate. He lost his position as chair of the Revenue committee and was replaced by Grant Larson in 1996, as senate rules prohibited statewide candidates from serving as chairs of committee.

United States Senate

Elections

Senator Simpson, who was first elected in 1978, announced on December 3, 1995, that he would not seek reelection in the 1996 election. Enzi announced on April 9, 1996, that he would run for the Republican nomination to succeed Simpson in the United States Senate. Enzi won a straw poll conducted at the state convention with 159 of the 457 votes. He won the Republican nomination against multiple candidates, including John Barrasso who would later be appointed to the Senate in 2007. Barrasso had initially been expected to win the Republican nomination, but lost due to his support for abortion rights while Enzi opposed abortion. He defeated Democratic nominee Kathy Karpan in the general election.

He announced on March 22, 2002, that he would run for reelection in the 2002 election and Dick Bratton served as his campaign chair. Enzi defeated Crosby Allen, a county commissioner from Fremont County, in the Republican primary and Democratic nominee Joyce Corcoran, who was the mayor of Lander, Wyoming, in the general election. During the 2002 election Enzi raised $1,443,925.00 and spent $1,130,628.00 compared to Corcoran who had raised $8,488.00 and spent $8,467.00.

Liz Cheney initially opposed him in the Republican primary during the 2014 election, but polling showed that Enzi would defeat her and she dropped out citing health concerns in her family.

On May 5, 2019, Enzi announced that he would not seek reelection in the 2020 election. Cynthia Lummis won the Republican nomination and defeated Democratic nominee Merav Ben-David in the general election. He was the longest-serving senator from Wyoming since Francis E. Warren.

Tenure

During Enzi's tenure in the Senate he served on the Labor and Human Resources, Small Business and Entrepreneurship, and the Banking, Housing, and Urban Affairs committees. In 2001, he was given Jim Jeffords' position on the Foreign Relations committee after Jeffords left the Republican Party to become an independent. Enzi served as chair of the Health, Education, Labor and Pensions, and Budget committees. He also served as chair of the Banking Subcommittee on National Security and International Trade and Finance, and the Labor Subcommittee on Employment, Safety, and Training.

Scott Ratliff, a former member of the Wyoming House of Representatives, served on Enzi's staff for issues about the Wind River Indian Reservation.

In 1997, Enzi asked to be allowed to bring his laptop onto the Senate floor as it was easier than carrying multiple briefcases, but the Senate rules prohibited all mechanical devices that could distract senators unless the Sergeant at Arms ruled that those devices were necessary and proper for the conduction of official business. Sergeant at Arms Gregory S. Casey conducted a three-month study and said that the rules of the Senate allowed members to use laptops on the floor, but not if they were connected to an outside network. Senator John Warner, the chair of the Rules Committee, sent the report to all 100 senators for consideration in September. Robert Torricelli opposed allowing laptops onto the floor stating that it would lead to staff instructing senators how to vote and Robert Byrd also opposed it stating that the sound of typing would be irritating. Senators Wendell Ford, Dianne Feinstein, and Kay Bailey Hutchison also opposed allowing laptops onto the floor. On November 5, the Rules Committee voted against allowing Enzi to bring his laptop onto the floor with Rick Santorum being the only member voting to allow laptops onto the floor. All personal electronic devices are still prohibited from the floor.

During the 2000 presidential election he praised George W. Bush's selection of Dick Cheney as his vice-presidential running mate stating that Cheney was "an outstanding selection" and that he was "excited not just for Wyoming, but for the whole country". Following Trent Lott's resignation Enzi lobbied for Bill Frist to become the Majority Leader of the Senate.

He was given the Distinguished Eagle Scout Award in 1999, making him the first Wyomingite to receive the award, after being nominated by the Central Wyoming Council and the Boy Scouts of America. Enzi and Representative Cliff Stearns were awarded the Stuart Symington award, given for outstanding civilian contribution in the field of national security, by the Air Force Association, which was their highest civilian award, for co-founding the Congressional Air Force Caucus.

Death
On July 23, 2021, Enzi broke his neck and multiple ribs in a bicycling accident near his home in Gillette. He was flown to a hospital in Loveland, Colorado, where he died on July 26.

Political positions

Enzi opposed the Bipartisan Campaign Reform Act, voted to sustain a filibuster against it stating that it violated the First Amendment rights of interest groups to contribute money in 1997 and 1998, and voted against the legislation while sixty members of the Senate voted in favor of it in 2002. He returned campaign contributions given to him by Enron following their scandal. In 2000, Enzi asked Senator William Roth, the chair of the Finance Committee, to implement geographic equity for Medicare spending in order to give money to rural healthcare.

Crime and guns

While in the state legislature Enzi and Senator John Perry cosponsored legislation to make the assault and battery of people above the age of sixty-five a high misdemeanor. He supported capital punishment. Enzi asked Attorney General Janet Reno to make assisted suicide illegal as the Drug Enforcement Administration had ruled. He voted against the Comprehensive Immigration Reform Act of 2006.

Enzi initially supported the Violent and Repeat Juvenile Offender Act to reduce crimes committed by juveniles, but withdrew his support stating that the legislation infringed on the Second Amendment. During the votes on amendments to the Juvenile Justice Enforcement Act he voted against requiring background checks for firearms sales at gun shows and flea markets, regulating the transfer of firearms through the internet, and banning the importation of high capacity ammunition magazines. Enzi was one of two senators who voted against an amendment to the Juvenile Justice Enforcement Act which prohibited juveniles from purchasing or possessing assault-style semi-automatic weapons without the consent of a parent.

Enzi was given an A rating by the National Rifle Association during the 1996 election. Enzi introduced legislation in 2001, which would have required law enforcement to destroy the records created by the Federal Bureau of Investigation of people who passed a background check for a gun purchase.

Enzi supported the creation of an amendment prohibiting the desecration of the flag of the United States. In 2000, the Senate voted sixty-three to thirty-seven, with Enzi in favor, in favor of an amendment prohibiting flag desecration, but it failed to receive a two-thirds majority. In 2006, the Senate voted sixty-six to thirty-four, with Enzi in favor, in favor of an amendment prohibiting flag desecration, but it failed to receive a two-thirds majority.

Economics

In 1994, the state senate voted twenty-nine to one, with Enzi as the only vote against, in favor of placing a moratorium on the sale of state land. Enzi voted against an amendment to raise the minimum wage by $1 over the course of two years in 1998. In 1999, Enzi and twenty-two other senators wrote a letter to Clinton asking him to implement tariffs to protect lamb production in the United States. He supported a ruling by the United States International Trade Commission which would allow tariffs on what imports from Canada.

Enzi supported the creation of a balanced budget amendment and stated that without the amendment the president could use "smoke and mirrors" to circumvent requirements for a balanced budget. Enzi was given a Taxpayer's Friend award by the National Taxpayers Union in their 1999 report. Enzi opposed the estate tax and criticized Clinton for vetoing legislation to phase out the estate tax at the federal level over the course of ten years.

Enzi opposed a ballot initiative that would allow counties in Wyoming to legalize gambling and he served as director of Wyomingites for a Better Economy Today and Tomorrow which opposed the initiative. Enzi introduced an amendment to legislation for the United States Department of the Interior's spending in the Senate to prohibit the approving of new Native American casinos without state approval. The Arapaho and Shoshone tribes criticized Enzi for introducing the legislation without consulting them. He later asked for Bruce Babbitt to overstep his authority as Secretary of the Interior for tribal gambling issues. Ron Allen, the president of the National Congress of American Indians and chair of the Klallam tribe, criticized Enzi for attempting to limit the power of Native Americans to negotiate gambling contracts with the federal government.

Environment

Enzi and Senator Byrd co-sponsored a resolution calling for President Bill Clinton to not sign global climate agreements if they harmed the interests of the United States or if they failed to include developing nations with the resolution being in response to the United Nations Framework Convention on Climate Change. Enzi opposed the Kyoto Protocol and he attended the conference where the participants did not agree with his the United States Senate's view on climate change. The Public Interest Research Group gave Enzi a zero percent rating for votes on environmental legislation conducted between March 1997 and March 1998. He supported drilling in the Arctic National Wildlife Refuge.

Equality

Enzi was given a zero percent rating from NARAL Pro-Choice America in its 1997 report. He was given a F rating by the NAACP in 2002. Enzi cosponsored a resolution expressing support for Judge Roy Moore's attempts to have the Ten Commandments displayed in his courtroom.

Enzi led the effort to create the Sacagawea dollar to honor Sacagawea and replace the Susan B. Anthony dollar despite other members of the Senate who wanted the coin to depict the Statue of Liberty, Clara Barton, Shirley Chisholm, Rosa Parks, Pocahontas, or another figure. Enzi wrote a letter to Treasurer Robert Rubin asking for the coin to be unveiled at Fort Washakie. Enzi opposed the creation of federal hate crime legislation and attempts by President Clinton to expand federal hate crime legislation. Wyoming later made the Sacagawea coin its official state coin.

Enzi supported legislation in the state senate to declare all same-sex marriages, including those conducted outside of the state, void in Wyoming. He supported the Boy Scouts exclusion of gay scouts and leaders and supported legislation to end federal aid to schools which prohibited the Boy Scouts due to their refusal to admit gay members. Enzi supported Santorum's comments on Lawrence v. Texas in which Santorum stated that sodomy laws should be upheld. In 2004, the Senate voted fifty to forty-eight, with Enzi in favor, against the Federal Marriage Amendment which would have prohibited gay marriage. Enzi released a statement following the murder of Matthew Shepard in which he denounced the murder and expressed sympathy for his family, but he later voted against the Matthew Shepard and James Byrd Jr. Hate Crimes Prevention Act.

Foreign policy

Enzi supported the International Monetary Fund's bailout of South Korea during the 1997 Asian financial crisis. He opposed sending soldiers to Kosovo to participate in the Kosovo War and stated that "there was no exit plan built in". Enzi voted to express Congressional approval for the prosecution of war crimes and crimes against humanity committed during the Yugoslav Wars.

He voted in favor of the Authorization for Use of Military Force of 2001 and the Authorization for Use of Military Force Against Iraq Resolution of 2002. Enzi praised Bush's 2003 State of the Union Address stating that he had made solid arguments against Iraq's weapons of mass destruction and the need to disarm Iraq and later stated that Saddam Hussein must be overthrown to disarm Iraq. He stated that he still believed that Iraq had weapons of mass destruction despite no weapons of mass destruction being discovered following the invasion of Iraq.

Enzi opposed the Comprehensive Nuclear-Test-Ban Treaty stating that the United States needed to test its nuclear weapons as one-third of the nuclear weapons were detected to have flaws from 1945 to 1992. He supported either amending or leaving the Anti-Ballistic Missile Treaty.

Enzi supported legislation to end the blockade on food and medicine sales and donations to Cuba in 1998, and later asked Bush to lift restrictions on selling American food and medicine to Cuba. Enzi stated that the United States Congress should not become involved with Elián González. In 2003, he and Senator Max Baucus called for travel restrictions to Cuba to be lifted. He and Senator Byron Dorgan introduced the Freedom to Travel to Cuba Act with other Democratic and Republican senators to allow Americans to travel to Cuba in 2009, and supported other legislation to allow Americans to travel to Cuba.

Impeachment

The Senate voted seventy to thirty, with Enzi against, against calling Monica Lewinsky to testify in the impeachment trial of Clinton. He voted to convict Clinton on both articles of impeachment, but neither article received enough support to remove Clinton.

Enzi, along with 51 other Republican Senators, voted against convicting Donald Trump on both articles of impeachment in his first impeachment trial. As a result, Trump was acquitted of both articles.

Judicial appointments

In 2005, the Senate voted seventy-eight to twenty-two, with Enzi in favor, in favor of appointing John Roberts to serve as Chief Justice of the United States.

Electoral history

References

External links
Michael B. Enzi papers at the University of Wyoming – American Heritage Center
 
 
 
 Enzi statement on the impeachment trial of Bill Clinton

|-

|-

|-

|-

1944 births
2021 deaths
20th-century American politicians
21st-century American politicians
American accountants
American gun rights activists
American Presbyterians
Cycling road incident deaths
George Washington University School of Business alumni
Mayors of places in Wyoming
Republican Party members of the Wyoming House of Representatives
People from Bremerton, Washington
People from Gillette, Wyoming
People from Thermopolis, Wyoming
Republican Party United States senators from Wyoming
Road incident deaths in Colorado
University of Denver alumni
Republican Party Wyoming state senators
New Right (United States)